Petra Praise 2: We Need Jesus is the sixteenth studio album of the Christian rock band Petra and their second praise album. It was released on February 18, 1997.

The album was released amidst some major line-up changes in the band, and it features contributions of several musicians. It's the first album to feature Lonnie Chapin on bass guitar, who would become the band's full-time bassist until 2001.

The music is a mixture of traditional and original praise songs with a rock style. It is considered to be more diverse musically than the band's first, straight forward hard rock, praise album. Most of the original songs were penned by band founder Bob Hartman (except "Song of Moses" that was written by former keyboardist Jim Cooper and well-known musician Brian Wooten).

The title song features lead singer John Schlitt pairing up with producer and fellow singer John Elefante and singer Lou Gramm (from Foreigner).

Track listing
All songs written by Bob Hartman, except where noted.
 "Song of Moses, Rev.  – 15:3-4" (words & music by Jim Cooper and Brian Wooten) – 4:17
 "Lord, I Lift Your Name on High" (Words & Music by Rick Founds) – 3:02
 "Be of Good Cheer" – 3:55
 "Show Your Power" (words & music by Kevin Prosch) – 4:10
 "I Love You Lord" (words & music by Laurie Klein) – 3:53
 "The Holiest Name" – 3:34
 "Let Our Voices Rise Like Incense" (words & music by Linda Whitmer-Bell) – 2:29
 "Ancient of Days" (words & music by Gary Sadler and Jamie Harvill)– 3:52
 "I Waited For The Lord on High" (words & music by Bill Batstone) – 2:47
 "Lovely Lord" – 4:25
 Medley – 5:58
 "Only by Grace" (words & music by Gerrit Gustafson)
 "To Him Who Sits on the Throne" (words & music by Debbye Graafsma)
 "You Are Holy" (words & music by Scott Wesley Brown)
 "We Need Jesus" (words & music by Scott Springer, John & Dino Elefante) – 4:14

Awards
 Nominated for a Grammy Award for Best Pop/Contemporary Gospel Album in 1997.
 Won a Dove Award for Praise and Worship album in 1998.

Personnel 

Petra
 John Schlitt – lead vocals, background vocals 
 Bob Hartman – lead guitars
 David Lichens – guitars 
 Lonnie Chapin – bass guitar, background vocals 
 Louie Weaver – drums

Guest musicians
 Jeff "Max" Roach
 Gary Burnette
 Scott Denté
 George Marinelli
 Matt Pierson
 Dan Needham
 Crys – background vocals 
 Lisa C. – background vocals 
 Lissa – background vocals
 John Elefante – background vocals, additional lead vocals on "We Need Jesus"
 Lou Gramm – additional lead vocals on "We Need Jesus"

Production
 Bob Hartman – executive producer
 John Elefante – producer
 Dino Elefante – producer, engineer at The Sound Kitchen, Franklin, Tennessee
 Joe Baldridge – engineer 
 Richie Biggs – overdub engineer at The Border, Franklin, Tennessee; Battery Studios, Nashville, Tennessee; and The Snack Bar, Brentwood, Tennessee
 Tim Coyle – assistant engineer 
 Daryl Roudebush – assistant engineer 
 David Thoener – mixing at The Sound Kitchen (1, 4, 5, 10, 11, 12)
 Steve Marcantonio – mixing at The Sound Kitchen (2, 3, 6, 9)
 Bob Ludwig – mastering at Gateway Mastering, Portland, Maine
 Christy Coxe – executive art direction 
 Kerosene Halo – art direction, design 
 Mark Smalling – photography

References

1997 albums
Petra (band) albums